Facundo Omar Cardozo (born 6 April 1995) is an Argentine footballer who plays as a centre-back or left-back for Arsenal de Sarandí.

Club career
Cardozo is a youth exponent from Vélez Sarsfield. He made his league debut during the 2013–14 season. At 3 November 2013, he scored his first league goal against Quilmes.

After Fernando Tobio left the team for the 2014 Argentine Primera División, Cardozo became a starter along Sebastián Domínguez at centre back.

On January 17, 2016 he signed a loan deal with Bolivian side Bolívar after an official announcement was made through the official Twitter account of the CEO of Club Bolívar, Marcelo Claure.

On 12 August 2016 Vélez Sarsfield announced that Cardozo has signed with Indian Super League side Mumbai City FC in a 6-month loan deal without a purchase option.

International career
In 2015, Cardozo was called to play for the Argentina national under-20 football team in the South American Youth Championship. He was a starter in 7 of his team's 9 games in the tournament, scoring once and winning the championship.

Honours
Vélez Sarsfield
Supercopa Argentina (1): 2013

Argentina U-20
South American Youth Football Championship (1): 2015

References

External links
 Profile at Vélez Sarsfield's official website 
 Argentine Primera statistics at Fútbol XXI  
 

1995 births
Living people
Argentine footballers
Argentine expatriate footballers
Association football defenders
Club Atlético Vélez Sarsfield footballers
Club Bolívar players
Mumbai City FC players
Coquimbo Unido footballers
Arsenal de Sarandí footballers
All Boys footballers
Club Atlético Platense footballers
Sabail FK players
Chilean Primera División players
Argentine Primera División players
Bolivian Primera División players
2015 South American Youth Football Championship players
Argentine expatriate sportspeople in Chile
Expatriate footballers in Chile
Argentine expatriate sportspeople in Bolivia
Expatriate footballers in Bolivia
Argentine expatriate sportspeople in India
Expatriate footballers in India
Sportspeople from Buenos Aires Province